The Sixth Commandment (Swedish: Sjätte budet) is a 1947 Swedish drama film directed by and starring Stig Järrel and also featuring Ester Roeck Hansen, Gösta Cederlund and Ingrid Backlin. It was shot at the Centrumateljéerna Studios in Stockholm. The film's sets were designed by the art director Nils Nilsson. The title refers to the Sixth Commandment for Lutherans "Thou shalt not commit adultery".

Synopsis
Jane Hagwald has been married for many years and has grown gradually dissatisfied in the relationship, and she takes a lover. When her daughter discovers her affair she drives her out of the home.

Cast
 Ester Roeck Hansen as Jane Hagwald
 Stig Järrel as 	Dr. Krister Ekberg
 Gösta Cederlund as 	Karl hagwald
 Ingrid Backlin as Kerstin Hagwald
 Irma Christenson as Märta Widen
 Lauritz Falk as 	Bengt Bernfors
 Margot Ryding as 	Maja
 Mimi Pollak as 	Woman
 Ebba Wrede as 	Woman
 Anna-Stina Wåglund as 	Woman

References

Bibliography 
 Ramsaye, Terry. International Motion Picture Almanac. Quigley Publishing Company, 1948.

External links 
 

1947 films
Swedish drama films
1947 drama films
1940s Swedish-language films
Swedish black-and-white films
1940s Swedish films